The Shanti Swarup Bhatnagar Prize for Science and Technology is one of the highest multidisciplinary science awards in India. It was instituted in 1958 by the Council of Scientific and Industrial Research in honor of Shanti Swarup Bhatnagar, its founder director and recognizes excellence in scientific research in India.

List of recipients

General information

Biological Sciences

Chemical Sciences

Earth, Atmosphere Ocean and Planetary Sciences

Engineering Sciences

Mathematical Sciences

Medical Sciences

Physical Sciences

See also 
 Shanti Swarup Bhatnagar Prize
 Council of Scientific and Industrial Research

Notes

References

External links 
 
 
 
 

Shanti Swarup Bhatnagar Prize recipients
Recipients of the Shanti Swarup Bhatnagar Prize for Science and Technology
Recipients of the Shanti Swarup Bhatnagar Award in Mathematical Science
Recipients of the Shanti Swarup Bhatnagar Award in Biological Science
Recipients of the Shanti Swarup Bhatnagar Award in Earth, Atmosphere, Ocean & Planetary Sciences
Recipients of the Shanti Swarup Bhatnagar Award in Engineering Science
Recipients of the Shanti Swarup Bhatnagar Award in Medical Science
Indian science and technology awards